Thomas or Tom Flanagan may refer to:

Thomas Flanagan (bishop) (1930–2019), American Roman Catholic bishop
Thomas Flanagan (Irish politician) (died 1980), Irish civil engineer and politician
Thomas Flanagan (priest) (1814–1865), English Roman Catholic canon and historian
Thomas Flanagan (prospector) (1832–1899), Irish-Australian prospector
Thomas Flanagan (writer) (1923–2002), American academic and novelist 
Tom Flanagan (footballer) (born 1991), English footballer
Tom Flanagan (political scientist) (born 1944), American-born writer and academic
Tommy Flanagan (1930–2001), American jazz pianist
Tommy Flanagan (actor) (born 1965), Scottish-born actor
Thomas John (medium) (born 1984), American celebrity medium
Tommy Flanagan, the Pathological Liar, recurring Saturday Night Live character and sketches portrayed by Jon Lovitz in 1985–86 season